The 50–40–90 club is an informal statistic used to rate players as excellent shooters in the National Basketball Association (NBA), NBA G League, and Women's National Basketball Association (WNBA). It requires a player to achieve the criteria of 50% field goal percentage, 40% three-point field goal percentage and 90% free throw percentage over the course of a regular season, while meeting the minimum thresholds to qualify as a league leader in each category.

In NBA, WNBA, and NBA G League history, only 11 players have recorded a 50–40–90 season, with nine in the NBA and one each in the WNBA and the NBA G League. The most recent player to achieve a 50–40–90 season was Kyrie Irving in 2020–21.

History
The 50–40–90 season has only been a possibility since the introduction of the three-point field goal in the 1979–80 NBA season.

Steve Nash and Larry Bird are the only players who have had multiple 50–40–90 seasons. Bird recorded consecutive 50–40–90 seasons in 1986–87 and 1987–88, while Nash recorded four such seasons between 2005 and 2010. Nash narrowly missed five consecutive 50–40–90 seasons by shooting at 89.9% from the free throw line during the 2006–07 season, one made free throw short of the 90% mark.

Quinn Cook became the first NBA G League player to record a 50–40–90 season in 2018.

Elena Delle Donne became the first WNBA player to record a 50–40–90 season in 2019.

List and calculations

NBA
Similar to baseball batting averages, official NBA shooting statistics are calculated to the third decimal place (thousandths), but are referred to as percentages. While the NBA officially uses a three-digit number, it reports shooting statistics in a shortened and rounded form as a percentage, so that .899 to the third decimal place is simplified as a two digit "90%" in most of its reporting. Thus, a true 50–40–90 season requires a player to achieve or exceed 50.0 percent field goal efficiency, 40.0 percent three-point field goal efficiency and 90.0 percent free-throw shooting efficiency. As of 2021, the NBA requires a player to make at least 300 field goals, 82 three-pointers, and 125 free throws to be a leader in the respective category. For shortened seasons, stats are prorated to an 82 game season.

NBA G League

WNBA

References

Basketball terminology
National Basketball Association statistical leaders